Phyllocnistis sciophanta is a moth of the family Gracillariidae, known from Peru. It was described by E. Meyrick in 1915.

References

Phyllocnistis
Endemic fauna of Peru
Moths of South America